Trachusa is a genus of leafcutter, mason, and resin bees in the family Megachilidae. There are at least 50 described species in Trachusa.

Species
These 57 species belong to the genus Trachusa:

 Trachusa alamosana Thorp & Brooks, 1994 i c g
 Trachusa aquiphila (Strand, 1912) i c g
 Trachusa atlantica (Benoist, 1934) g
 Trachusa atoyacae (Schwarz, 1933) i c g
 Trachusa autumnalis (Snelling, 1966) i c g
 Trachusa baluchistanica (Mavromoustakis, 1939) i c g
 Trachusa barkamensis (Wu, 1986) i c g
 Trachusa bequaerti (Schwarz, 1926) i c g
 Trachusa byssina (Panzer, 1798) i c g
 Trachusa carinata (Wu, 1962) i c g
 Trachusa catinula Brooks & Griswold, 1988 i c g
 Trachusa concava (Wu, 1962) i c g
 Trachusa cordaticeps (Michener, 1949) i c g b
 Trachusa cornopes Wu, 2004 i c g
 Trachusa corona Wu, 2004 i c g
 Trachusa crassipes (Cresson, 1878) i c g
 Trachusa dorsalis (Lepeletier, 1841) i c g b
 Trachusa dumerlei (Warncke, 1980) i c g
 Trachusa eburneomaculata Pasteels, 1984 i c g
 Trachusa flavorufula Pasteels, 1969 i c g
 Trachusa fontemvitae (Schwarz, 1926) i c g b
 Trachusa forcipata (Morawitz, 1875) i c g
 Trachusa formosana (Friese, 1917) i c g
 Trachusa fulvopilosa Thorp & Brooks, 1994 i c g
 Trachusa gummifera Thorp, 1963 i c g
 Trachusa interdisciplinaris (Peters, 1972) i c g
 Trachusa interrupta (Fabricius, 1781) i c g
 Trachusa kashgarensis (Cockerell, 1911) i c g
 Trachusa laeviventris (Dours, 1873) i c g
 Trachusa larreae (Cockerell, 1897) i c g b
 Trachusa laticeps (Morawitz, 1873) i c g
 Trachusa longicornis (Friese, 1902) i c g
 Trachusa ludingensis (Wu, 1992) i c g
 Trachusa maai (Mavromoustakis, 1953) i c g
 Trachusa manni Crawford, 1917 i c g b
 Trachusa massauahensis Pasteels, 1984 i c g
 Trachusa mitchelli (Michener, 1948) i c g
 Trachusa muiri Mavromoustakis, 1936 i c g
 Trachusa nigrifascies Thorp & Brooks, 1994 i c g
 Trachusa notophila Thorp & Brooks, 1994 i c g
 Trachusa occidentalis (Cresson, 1868) i c g
 Trachusa orientalis Pasteels, 1972 i c g
 Trachusa ovata (Cameron, 1902) i c g
 Trachusa pectinata Brooks & Griswold, 1988 i c g
 Trachusa pendleburyi (Cockerell, 1927) i c g
 Trachusa perdita Cockerell, 1904 i c g b
 Trachusa popovii (Wu, 1962) i c g
 Trachusa pubescens (Morawitz, 1872) i c g
 Trachusa pueblana Thorp & Brooks, 1994 i c g
 Trachusa ridingsii (Cresson, 1878) i c g
 Trachusa rubopunctata (Wu, 1992) i c g
 Trachusa rufobalteata (Cameron, 1902) i c g
 Trachusa schoutedeni (Vachal, 1910) i c g
 Trachusa timberlakei (Schwarz, 1928) i c g b
 Trachusa xylocopiformis (Mavromoustakis, 1954) i c g
 Trachusa yunnanensis (Wu, 1992) i c g
 Trachusa zebrata (Cresson, 1872) i c g b

Data sources: i = ITIS, c = Catalogue of Life, g = GBIF, b = Bugguide.net

References

Further reading

External links

 

Megachilidae